Francisc Şirato (August 15, 1877, Craiova, Principality of Romania - August 4, 1953, Bucharest, Socialist Republic of Romania) was a Romanian painter, graphic artist, art critic, and designer.

External links 

 Biography

1877 births
1953 deaths
People from Craiova
Romanian art critics
Romanian caricaturists
Romanian cartoonists
Romanian essayists
Romanian journalists
20th-century Romanian painters